Aristolochia sempervirens is a species of perennial plant in the family Aristolochiaceae. It is found in the Eastern and Southern Mediterranean Basin, notably in Crete.

Description
Aristolochia sempervirens is an evergreen and woody climbing plant that grows up to 5 meters tall. The leaves are ovate-lanceolate, leathery and glabrous. They are deeply heart-shaped at the base and slightly eared. The flowers are yellow with purple stripes and 2 to 5 centimeters long. The tube is U-shaped.

The flowering period extends from March to July.

The chromosome number is 2n = 14

References

External links

sempervirens